Carlos Eduardo del Castillo del Carpio (born 27 December 1988) is a Bolivian lawyer and politician currently serving as the Minister of Government of Bolivia since 9 November 2020.

Biography 
Eduardo del Castillo was born on 27 December 1988 in Santa Cruz de la Sierra. He studied law at the Gabriel René Moreno Autonomous University graduating as a lawyer. He completed postgraduate studies, obtaining a master's degree in Tax and Financial Law from the Higher School of Law and has a diploma in Higher Education and Interculturality from the Higher University of San Andrés. He also holds a diploma in Economic, Social, and Cultural Rights from the University of Buenos Aires in Argentina.

A member of the Movement for Socialism (MAS) since 2005, del Castillo began his work in the Bolivian Chamber of Senators as a technical secretary and advisor to the Commission for Plural Justice. He later served as senior officer of the Senate. He worked in the Ministry of Government as a legal advisor in the Migration Directorate in Santa Cruz, then as a National Taxes lawyer in the Public Ministry in Santa Cruz.

Minister of Government (2020-present) 
On 9 November 2020, President Luis Arce appointed Eduardo del Castillo to the position of Minister of Government.  As Minister, del Castillo assured that "the regrettable figures" of COVID-19 seen in the previous administration would not be repeated.

References 

1988 births
Living people
21st-century Bolivian lawyers
21st-century Bolivian politicians
Government ministers of Bolivia
Luis Arce administration cabinet members
Interior ministers of Bolivia
Movement for Socialism (Bolivia) politicians
People from Santa Cruz de la Sierra
Gabriel René Moreno Autonomous University alumni